Andrew Wilson was an American baseball center fielder and pitcher in the Negro leagues. He played with the Milwaukee Bears in 1923.

References

External links
 and Seamheads

Milwaukee Bears players
Year of birth unknown
Year of death unknown
Baseball outfielders